Minuscule 317 (in the Gregory-Aland numbering), Nι31 (Soden), is a Greek minuscule manuscript of the New Testament, on parchment. Palaeographically it has been assigned to the 12th century.

Description 

The codex contains the text of the John 10:9-21:25 on 352 parchment leaves. The text is written in one column per page, in 29 lines per page. The biblical text is surrounded by a catena.

Kurt Aland did not place the Greek text of the codex in any Category.

History 

The manuscript belonged to the family of Medicis (like codex 42). It was added to the list of New Testament manuscripts by Scholz (1794–1852).
It was examined and described by Paulin Martin. C. R. Gregory saw the manuscript in 1885.

The manuscript is currently housed at the Bibliothèque nationale de France (Gr. 212) at Paris.

See also 

 List of New Testament minuscules
 Biblical manuscript
 Textual criticism

References

Further reading

External links 
 Minuscule 317 at the Encyclopedia of Textual Criticism

Greek New Testament minuscules
12th-century biblical manuscripts
Bibliothèque nationale de France collections